Deirdre Clancy (born 31 March 1943) is a British costume designer. She has won the Olivier Award for Best Costume Design twice. She also won the BAFTA Award for Best Costume Design for Mrs. Brown.

She started working in the London theatre in the 1960s and has worked on more than 150 theatre, opera and ballet productions around the world.

In 2000 the University of Central England conferred a doctorate on her. Her work has been the subject of a doctoral thesis by Dr Amela Baksic at Louisiana State University.

She is married to composer Maxwell Steer.

Publications
 Costume since 1945: Couture, street style and anti-fashion. Herbert Press (31 Oct 1996) 
 The 80s and 90s. (Costume Source Books) (Costume and Fashion Source Books), Chelsea House Publishers; (15 Feb 2009), .
 Colonial America. (Costume Source Books) (Costume and Fashion Source Books), (with Amela Baksic), Chelsea House Publishers; (15 Feb 2009)

References

1943 births
Living people
Best Costume Design BAFTA Award winners
British costume designers